Gabre may refer to:

People
 Eleni Gabre-Madhin, Ethiopian economist
 Gabre Gabric, Italian track and field athlete
 Gabre Heard, Ethiopian general
 Girmaye Gabre (born 1950), Ethiopian boxer
 Tsegaye Gabre-Medhin (1936–2006), Ethiopian poet, playwright and art director

Places
 Gabre, Ariège, commune in the Ariège department in southwestern France

Other
 GABRE, gene that codes for the Gamma-aminobutyric acid receptor subunit epsilon protein